Scomberoides is a genus of carangids, known as the queenfishes, native to the Indian Ocean and the western Pacific Ocean. The species in this genus may be venomous with the venom found on the spines of the dorsal and anal fins.

Species
Currently, five species in this genus are recognized:
 Scomberoides commersonnianus Lacépède, 1801 (Talang queenfish)
 Scomberoides lysan (Forsskål, 1775) (doublespotted queenfish)
 Scomberoides pelagicus E.M. Abdussamad, A. Gopalakrishnan, K.G. Mini, S. Sukumaran, P.R. Divya, T.B. Retheesh, A.A. Muhammed, N.V. Dipti, A.R. Akhil, T. Thomas and K.D. Jacob, 2022 (Deepbodied Queenfish)
 Scomberoides tala (Cuvier, 1832) (barred queenfish)
 Scomberoides tol (Cuvier, 1832) (needle-scaled queenfish)

References

 
Scomberoidinae
Taxa named by Bernard Germain de Lacépède
Marine fish genera